Boms is a municipality in the district of Ravensburg in Baden-Württemberg in Germany.

Population development
1829: 370 
1900: 458 
1969: 466 
2004: 577 
2008: 655
2020: 706

References

Ravensburg (district)